Remigijus Valiulis (born 20 September 1958 in Šilutė, Lithuanian SSR) is a Lithuanian retired athlete. He was a gold medalist in the men's 4x400 meter relay at the 1980 Summer Olympics for the Soviet Union and as a singles runner he took the bronze medal at the 1980 European Athletics Indoor Championships.

Achievements

References
 
 OLYMPIC TRACK AND FIELD MEDAL WINNERS (Men's 4x400 meter relay). Sports Illustrated.

1958 births
Living people
Olympic athletes of the Soviet Union
Soviet male sprinters
Lithuanian male sprinters
Athletes (track and field) at the 1980 Summer Olympics
Olympic gold medalists for the Soviet Union
Valiulis
Olympic gold medalists in athletics (track and field)
Honoured Masters of Sport of the USSR
Medalists at the 1980 Summer Olympics